Reutlingen, nicknamed "The Gate to the Swabian Alb", is a Landkreis (district) in the middle of Baden-Württemberg, Germany.
The former free imperial city (until 1802) reached the limit of 100,000 residents in 1989. It is the ninth-largest city in Baden-Württemberg. Reutlingen district's neighboring districts are (from north clockwise) Esslingen, Göppingen, Alb-Donau, Biberach, Sigmaringen, Zollernalbkreis, Tübingen and Böblingen.

History
The district dates back to the Oberamt Reutlingen, which was created in 1803 when the previously free imperial city Reutlingen became part of Württemberg. In 1934, it was converted into the district, in 1938 the district Urach was dissolved and split between the districts Reutlingen and Münsingen. In 1973 the district Münsingen was dissolved, and most part was merged into the district Reutlingen. A few municipalities from the districts Tübingen, Saulgau, Sigmaringen and Nürtingen were also added.

Geography
The district is largely located in the Swabian Alb (Schwäbische Alb).

Economy and infrastructure

Transport 
The district has no national (A) motorway (German: Autobahn) but has large Federal/National roads (German: Bundesstraßen):
 B 27, Stuttgart - Tübingen
 B 28, Tübingen - Ulm
 B 312, starting at A 8 exit 53b (Plieningen), Stuttgart Airport - A 7 exit 127 (Berkheim), ending near Memmingen, part of the dismissed A 85
 B 313, Plochingen - Sigmaringen
 B 464, distributor road from Reutlingen to B 27, only driving direction Stuttgart in district
 B 465, starting at A 8 exit 57 (Kirchheim unter Teck) - ending at Leutkirch im Allgäu

Partnerships
The district had a friendship with the Czech district Chrudim. In 2002, the Czech districts were reformed and the region Pardubice became the successor of the district Chrudim.

The district also has a friendship with the Italian
Province of Parma, as well as the district Sächsische Schweiz (now part of Sächsische Schweiz-Osterzgebirge) in Saxony.

Coat of arms
The coat of arms is the coat of arms of the Counts of Achalm, who ruled the largest part of the district until the 11th century. Even though these counts never used arms by themselves, the Zwiefalten Abbey appointed them these arms.

Cities and towns

Towns
 Bad Urach
 Hayingen
 Metzingen
 Münsingen
 Pfullingen
 Reutlingen
 Trochtelfingen

Administrative collectivities
 Engstingen
 Metzingen
 Münsingen
 Pliezhausen
 Bad Urach
 Zwiefalten-Hayingen

Municipalities

References

External links

Official website (German)

 
Tübingen (region)
Districts of Baden-Württemberg